The Pulsars was a new wave/indie rock band from Chicago, Illinois, led by Dave Trumfio and his brother, Harry Trumfio. They signed to Herb Alpert and Jerry Moss's Almo Sounds label and recorded two albums in the mid-1990s, one of which was released and another that has yet to be released.

History
The band comprised the brothers Dave and Harry Trumfio, with Harry on drums and Dave producing, singing and playing all of the other instruments. The brothers had played together in bands since they were at school, and recorded at home. Trumfio named his synthesizers and electronic gear 'Theodore 9000', which he described as "the third member of our band", and the brothers considered 'T9000' as the name of the band before deciding on the Pulsars. Dave Trumfio had previously played in Ashtray Boy and the Mekons.

The Pulsars' first release was the Teenage Nites EP, on the Sweet Pea label in 1995. They were then signed to Almo Sounds in a 2.5 million, three-album deal, with their first release for the label being the five-track Submission to the Master EP, on which label-boss Alpert contributed trumpet.

The band's self-titled debut album was released on Almo Sounds in 1997, and was described as "an album that's in the moment, behind the times, and looking to the future", with influences from the early 1980s. However, critic Ritchie Unterberger viewed the band's sound as "considerably more enjoyable and warm" than their 1970s and 1980s influences, describing the album as "pleasant, catchy retro-new wave". SPINs Eric Weisbard described the album's songs as "amazingly confident, catchy anthems". In the view of Trouser Press writer Ira Robbins:

Several of the band's lyrics dealt with futuristic topics such as robots, spaceships, and aliens. The debut album included "Tunnel Song", which was described as "a romantic ballad about the great highway tunnels of America", and "My Pet Robot", a love song to Theodore 9000. The band's sound has been described as "a schizoid patchwork of synth-pop, new wave and R&B". The band was compared with Pixies by Allmusic writer Nitsuh Abebe, and was likened to the Cars and the Cure by USA Today'''s Edna Gundersen. The band's live shows included dub interludes.

The band was described as "Chicago's pre-eminent new wave revival band" by the Chicago Reader, and "profoundly great" by Trouser Press.

The band split up before their second album was completed, with Dave Trumfio become increasingly busy with production work, but reunited for a one-off performance in 2009 at the Bell House in Brooklyn. The brothers reportedly had plans to complete the second Pulsars album, and were working again under the name Our Future.

On April 1, 2021, the Pulsars' Twitter and Facebook accounts announced the release of Lost Transmissions'', a 15 track collection of rare and unreleased songs, available for pre-order through Bandcamp. It was released on August 1.

Members
Dave Trumfio – vocals, guitar, keyboards, programming
Harry Trumfio – drums, keyboards, programming, backing vocals

Discography

Albums

Singles/EPs

References

External links
[ The Pulsars at AllMusic.com]
The Pulsars Myspace
Review of the Pulsars' Submission to the Master
The Pulsars on Machine Talk

Musical groups established in 1994
Musical groups disestablished in 2000
American new wave musical groups
Musical groups from Chicago
Musical groups from Los Angeles